Sun Yanan (born 15 September 1992 in Fengcheng, Liaoning). She is a Chinese freestyle wrestler. She won the silver medal in the women's 50 kg event at the 2020 Summer Olympics.

Career 
She competes in the 51 kg division and won the silver medal in the same division at the 2012 World Wrestling Championships. 

She bettered her performance in the 2013 World Wrestling Championships where she won the gold medal after defeating Erdenechimegiin Sumiyaa of Mongolia. 

Sun also won a gold medal at the 2016 Asian Wrestling Championships in Bangkok, Thailand.

References

External links
 
 
 

1992 births
Living people
Sportspeople from Dandong
Chinese female sport wrestlers
Olympic medalists in wrestling
Olympic wrestlers of China
Wrestlers at the 2016 Summer Olympics
2016 Olympic bronze medalists for China
Wrestlers at the 2014 Asian Games
Asian Games medalists in wrestling
World Wrestling Championships medalists
Asian Games silver medalists for China
People from Fengcheng, Liaoning
Medalists at the 2014 Asian Games
Wrestlers at the 2018 Asian Games
Wrestlers at the 2020 Summer Olympics
Medalists at the 2020 Summer Olympics
Olympic silver medalists for China
21st-century Chinese women